The Felix Grundy Stidger House is a historic residence in Taylorsville, Kentucky, United States, that is listed on the National Register of Historic Places.

Description
The house is a saddlebag-plan log house. It was in very poor condition in September 2018. It is notable for its association with Felix Grundy Stidger (1836-1908), a Union spy during the American Civil War.

The house was listed on the National Register of Historic Places February 12, 2016.

See also

 National Register of Historic Places listings in Spencer County, Kentucky

References

External links

National Register of Historic Places in Spencer County, Kentucky
Log buildings and structures on the National Register of Historic Places in Kentucky
Double pen architecture in the United States
Houses on the National Register of Historic Places in Kentucky
Buildings and structures in Taylorsville, Kentucky